The 1998–99 NBA season was the 11th season for the Miami Heat in the National Basketball Association. On March 23, 1998, the owners of all 29 NBA teams voted 27–2 to reopen the league's collective bargaining agreement, seeking changes to the league's salary cap system, and a ceiling on individual player salaries. The National Basketball Players Association (NBPA) opposed to the owners' plan, and wanted raises for players who earned the league's minimum salary. After both sides failed to reach an agreement, the owners called for a lockout, which began on July 1, 1998, putting a hold on all team trades, free agent signings and training camp workouts, and cancelling many NBA regular season and preseason games. Due to the lockout, the NBA All-Star Game, which was scheduled to be played in Philadelphia on February 14, 1999, was also cancelled. However, on January 6, 1999, NBA commissioner David Stern, and NBPA director Billy Hunter finally reached an agreement to end the lockout. The deal was approved by both the players and owners, and was signed on January 20, ending the lockout after 204 days. The regular season began on February 5, and was cut short to just 50 games instead of the regular 82-game schedule.

During the off-season, the Heat signed free agents Terry Porter, Clarence Weatherspoon, and later on signed Blue Edwards in February. The team went on a 7-game winning streak after a 1–3 start, winning 18 of their first 23 games, despite Jamal Mashburn only playing just 24 games due to a knee injury, and Voshon Lenard missing 38 games with a stress fracture in his left leg. The Heat finished with a 33–17 win–loss record, which earned them the #1 seed in the Eastern Conference.

Alonzo Mourning averaged 20.1 points, 11.0 rebounds and 3.9 blocks per game, and was named Defensive Player of the Year, and finished in second place in Most Valuable Player voting behind Karl Malone of the Utah Jazz. He was also named to the All-NBA First Team, and NBA All-Defensive First Team. In addition, Tim Hardaway averaged 17.2 points and 7.3 assists per game, and was selected to the All-NBA Second Team, while Mashburn provided the team with 14.8 points per game, P.J. Brown provided with 11.4 points and 6.9 rebounds per game, and was named to the NBA All-Defensive Second Team, and Dan Majerle, who became the team's starting shooting guard, contributed 7.0 points per game. Off the bench, Porter contributed 10.5 points per game, and Weatherspoon averaged 8.1 points and 5.0 rebounds per game.

In the playoffs, the Heat faced the New York Knicks for the third consecutive time. The 8th-seeded Knicks defeated the Heat in the Eastern Conference First round, with Knicks guard Allan Houston hitting a buzzer-beater basket in the winner-take-all Game 5, which prevailed the Knicks over Miami, 78–77. With this loss, the Heat became the second number one seed in league history to lose a playoffs series against a number eight seed. The Knicks would become the first #8 seed to reach the NBA Finals, but would lose in five games to the San Antonio Spurs.

This was also the Heat's final full season playing at the Miami Arena. Following the season, Porter signed as a free agent with the San Antonio Spurs, while Terry Mills re-signed with his former team, the Detroit Pistons, and Edwards, and long-time Heat forward Keith Askins were both released to free agency.

Offseason

Draft picks

Roster

Regular season

Season standings

z - clinched division title
y - clinched division title
x - clinched playoff spot

Record vs. opponents

Playoffs

|- align="center" bgcolor="#ffcccc"
| 1
| May 8
| New York
| L 75–95
| Alonzo Mourning (27)
| Dan Majerle (10)
| Tim Hardaway (3)
| Miami Arena15,036
| 0–1
|- align="center" bgcolor="#ccffcc"
| 2
| May 10
| New York
| W 83–73
| Alonzo Mourning (26)
| Majerle, Mourning (8)
| Tim Hardaway (11)
| Miami Arena15,200
| 1–1
|- align="center" bgcolor="#ffcccc"
| 3
| May 12
| @ New York
| L 73–97
| Alonzo Mourning (18)
| P. J. Brown (8)
| Tim Hardaway (5)
| Madison Square Garden19,763
| 1–2
|- align="center" bgcolor="#ccffcc"
| 4
| May 14
| @ New York
| W 87–72
| Mourning, Porter (16)
| Alonzo Mourning (13)
| Terry Porter (7)
| Madison Square Garden19,763
| 2–2
|- align="center" bgcolor="#ffcccc"
| 5
| May 16
| New York
| L 77–78
| Alonzo Mourning (21)
| P. J. Brown (12)
| Tim Hardaway (8)
| Miami Arena14,985
| 2–3
|-

Player statistics

NOTE: Please write the players statistics in alphabetical order by last name.

Season

Playoffs

Awards and records
 Alonzo Mourning, NBA Defensive Player of the Year Award
 Alonzo Mourning, All-NBA First Team
 Alonzo Mourning, NBA All-Defensive First Team
 Tim Hardaway, All-NBA Second Team
 P.J. Brown, NBA All-Defensive Second Team

Transactions

References

 1998-99 Miami Heat

Miami Heat seasons
Miami Heat
Miami Heat
Miami Heat